Prime Time is the seventh studio album of the rock band FireHouse. It was released in 2003 by Pony Canyon in Japan, and in 2004 in the United States.

It is the only album to feature Dario Seixas on bass guitar, who left after the album was finished. Allen McKenzie since took his place.

Track listing
All songs written by Leverty and Snare except where noted.
 "Prime Time" (Foster, Leverty, Snare) - 4:34
 "Crash" (Foster, Leverty, Snare) - 4:33
 "Door to Door" (Foster, Leverty) - 5:27
 "Perfect Lie" - 4:30
 "Holding On" (Leverty) - 4:06
 "Body Language" - 3:53
 "I'm the One" (Leverty) - 5:24
 "Take Me Away" - 3:55
 "Home Tonight" (Foster, Leverty, Snare) - 3:31
 "Let Go" (Snare) - 4:39

Personnel
C.J. Snare - vocals, keyboards
Bill Leverty - guitars, vocals On Track 5 and 7
Michael Foster - drums, vocals On Track 3
Dario Seixas - bass guitar

References

2003 albums
FireHouse (band) albums
Pony Canyon albums